The 1994–95 Belarusian Premier League was the fourth season of top-tier football in Belarus. It started 13 July 1994, and ended on 23 June 1995. Dinamo Minsk were the defending champions.

Team changes from 1993–94 season
Stroitel Starye Dorogi, placed 16th last year, relegated to the First League. They were replaced by the 1993–94 First League winners Obuvshchik Lida.

Two teams changed their names during the winter break in the middle of the season. KIM Vitebsk were renamed to Dvina Vitebsk and Fandok Bobruisk to FC Bobruisk.

Overview
Dinamo Minsk won the championship for the 4th time in a row and qualified for the next season's UEFA Cup, as the Champions League was limited to 24 highest-ranked European national leagues which didn't include Belarus. The first-time Cup winners Dinamo-93 Minsk qualified for the Cup Winners' Cup. Gomselmash Gomel and Lokomotiv Vitebsk, who finished on 15th and 16th places, were relegated. It was the last season for Lokomotiv in Premier League as they dissolved after playing in lower leagues for a few years.

Teams and venues

Table

Results

Belarusian clubs in European Cups

Top scorers

See also
1994–95 Belarusian First League
1994–95 Belarusian Cup

External links
RSSSF

Belarusian Premier League seasons
1995 in Belarusian football
1994 in Belarusian football
Belarus